Erringden is a civil parish in the Metropolitan Borough of Calderdale in West Yorkshire, England. Previously it was a township within the chapelry of Heptonstall.

History
The first recorded mention of Erringden is in a deed from 1321, where it is named Heyrikdene, and it is described as a park for hunting.

Plans of an estate in Erringden produced in 1761 are the first known work by the land surveyor and engineer Robert Whitworth, who went on to become one of the leading canal engineers of his generation.

In the 1870s Erringden was described as

 'A township in Halifax parish, W. R. Yorkshire; adjacent to the York and Manchester railway, 7 miles NNW of Halifax. It includes part of Hebden-Bridge village, and part of Mytholmroyd hamlet; and has a fair, at Erringden-Moor, on the Friday after 11 Oct'.

Contemporary Erringden
In the 2001 census it had a population of 194.
By the 2011 census the population had dropped to 159.

See also
Listed buildings in Erringden

Bibliography

References

External links
Charlestown History Group

Civil parishes in West Yorkshire